Ophtalmibidion is a genus of beetles in the family Cerambycidae, containing the following species:

 Ophtalmibidion antonkozlovi Santos-Silva, Nascimento & Drumont, 2019
 Ophtalmibidion auba Martins & Galileo, 1999
 Ophtalmibidion gutta Vlasak & Santos-Silva, 2022
 Ophtalmibidion luscum Martins, 1971
 Ophtalmibidion oculatum Martins, 1969
 Ophtalmibidion tetrops (Bates, 1870)

References

Neoibidionini